This is the list of notable stars in the constellation Canis Major, sorted by decreasing brightness.

List

See also
Lists of stars by constellation

References

List
Canis Major